Yevgeni Lisovets (born 12 November 1994) is a Belarusian professional ice hockey defenceman. He is currently plays for Admiral Vladivostok of the Kontinental Hockey League (KHL) and the Belarus men's national ice hockey team.

Playing career
Lisovets began his third season with Salavat Yulaev Ufa in the 2021–22 campaign, posting 1 goals and 2 points through 18 games before he was  traded to HC Vityaz in exchange for Viktor Antipin on 19 November 2021.

On 11 June 2022, Lisovets left Podolsk as a free agent and signed a one-year contract with his fourth KHL club, Admiral Vladivostok.

International play
Lisovets was named to the Belarus men's national ice hockey team for competition at the 2015 IIHF World Championship.
Lisovets also played in the Spengler Cup in 2019-2020 for Salavat Yulaev Ufa of the KHL.

Career statistics

Regular season and playoffs

International

References

External links

1994 births
Living people
Admiral Vladivostok players
Belarusian ice hockey defencemen
HC Dinamo Minsk players
HK Neman Grodno players
Salavat Yulaev Ufa players
Shinnik Bobruisk players
Sportspeople from Grodno
HC Vityaz players